The two-woman bobsleigh competition at the 2014 Winter Olympics in Sochi, Russia was held at the Sliding Center Sanki near Krasnaya Polyana, Russia on 18–19 February.

Kaillie Humphries and Heather Moyse of Canada repeated as Olympic Champions, becoming the first duo to do so.

Records
While the IOC does not consider bobsled times eligible for Olympic records, the FIBT does maintain records for both the start and a complete run at each track at which it competes.

Results
Top finish in each run is in boldface. TR – track record.

On 24 November 2017, the Russian pair were disqualified after Olga Stulneva was sanctioned for a doping violation. After a CAS decision on 1 February 2018, the sanctions were annulled and their result was reinstated.

References

Bobsleigh at the 2014 Winter Olympics
Women's bobsleigh at the 2014 Winter Olympics
Women's events at the 2014 Winter Olympics
Bob